Muloorina  is both a pastoral lease that operates as a cattle station and a formal bounded locality in South Australia. The name and boundaries of the locality were created on 26 April 2013 after the long-established local name.

It is located on the edge of Lake Eyre, and Frome Creek runs through a portion of the station.

The property was established some time prior to 1880 on Tirari tribal land. By 1938 it was owned by Stan and Elliot Price and was under the management of Ellery Talbot. The property was flooded in 1938 when Frome Creek broke its banks.

In 1964, Donald Campbell and his 500 strong entourage stayed at the  property when he set the land speed record on the dry Lake Eyre in his car, Bluebird.

The historic Lake Harry Date Plantation Site is located at Muloorina and listed on the South Australian Heritage Register.

See also
List of ranches and stations

References

Stations (Australian agriculture)
Pastoral leases in South Australia
Far North (South Australia)